Grevillea callichlaena, commonly known as Mt. Benambra grevillea, is a species of flowering plant in the family Proteaceae and is endemic to a restricted part of Victoria in Australia. It is a spreading shrub with elliptic, egg-shaped or broadly lance-shaped leaves, and uniformly red flowers.

Description
The lower surface of the leaves is silky-hairy and the veins are conspicuous.

Taxonomy
Grevillea callichlaena was first formally described in 2005 by Bill Molyneux and Val Stajsic in the journal Muelleria from specimens collected from Mount Benambra in the Alpine National Park in 2002. The specific epithet (callichlaena) means "beauty-cloak", referring to the hairs covering the flowers.

Distribution and habitat
Mt. Benambra grevillea grows in woodland, often between scattered granite boulders, in two isolated populations on Mount Benambra in north-eastern Victoria.

Conservation status
The species is listed as "endangered" on the Department of Environment and Primary Industries Advisory list of rare or threatened plants in Victoria - 2014.

References

External links
Herbarium specimen at Royal Botanic Gardens Kew

callichlaena
Flora of Victoria (Australia)
Proteales of Australia
Plants described in 2005